Bróder is a 2009 Brazilian drama film directed by Jefferson De. It was screened in the Panorama section of the 60th Berlin International Film Festival and won Best Picture at the Gramado Film Festival.

References

External links 
 Bróder at IMDb

2009 drama films
Brazilian drama films
2000s Portuguese-language films